Ko Seung-beom (born 24 April 1994) is a South Korean footballer who plays as midfielder for Suwon Samsung Bluewings.

Career
Ko played college football for Kyunghee University.

Ko joined the K League 1 side Suwon Samsung Bluewings before the 2016 season began.

Club career statistics 
.

Honors

Club
Suwon Samsung Bluewings
Korean FA Cup Winner (2): 2016, 2019

Individual
Korean FA Cup Most Valuable Player (1): 2019

References

External links 

1994 births
Living people
People from Jeju Province
Sportspeople from Jeju Province
Association football midfielders
South Korean footballers
Suwon Samsung Bluewings players
Gimcheon Sangmu FC players
K League 1 players